Edward Boscawen, 1st Earl of Falmouth (10 May 1787 – 29 December 1841), known as the Viscount Falmouth between 1808 and 1821, was a British peer and politician.

Background

Falmouth was the son of George Boscawen, 3rd Viscount Falmouth and Elizabeth Anne, the only daughter of John Crewe, of Cheshire. He was educated at Eton College and served briefly as an Ensign in the Coldstream Guards.

Career

In the General Election of 1807, Falmouth was elected Member of Parliament for Truro, standing as a Tory on the day before his 20th birthday. On the death of his father the following year, he resigned both his seat and his commission and took up his place in the House of Lords. In 1821, on the coronation of George IV, he was created Earl of Falmouth.

As a member of the Ultra-Tory faction, he was vehemently opposed to parliamentary reform and Catholic emancipation. In 1829 he acted as second to Lord Winchilsea in his famous duel with the Duke of Wellington over the latter issue. He always insisted that he persuaded Winchelsea to fire into the air, and he had certainly prepared an apology, which Wellington accepted.

He was the last Recorder of Truro and the author of a pamphlet on the subject of stannary courts.

Family

Lord Falmouth was married to Anne Frances (1790–1864), elder daughter of Henry Bankes, of Kingston Lacy, Dorset on 27 August 1810. He died at Tregothnan in December 1841, aged 54, and was succeeded by his only son, George.

Lady Falmouth lived at 3 Whitehall Gardens, Westminster, until her death in 1864. A philanthropist, she endowed almshouses at Brimpton and a village school at Woolhampton, both in Berkshire.

References

External links

1787 births
1841 deaths
Earls in the Peerage of the United Kingdom
Members of the Parliament of the United Kingdom for Truro
UK MPs 1806–1807
UK MPs who inherited peerages
UK MPs who were granted peerages
People educated at Eton College
Coldstream Guards officers
Tory MPs (pre-1834)
Ultra-Tory peers
Edward
Peers of the United Kingdom created by George IV